Ampol Amaluktipituk (born 14 January 1950) is a Thai archer. He competed in the men's individual event at the 1984 Summer Olympics.

References

External links

1950 births
Living people
Ampol Amaluktipituk
Ampol Amaluktipituk
Archers at the 1984 Summer Olympics
Place of birth missing (living people)